Marcel Danesi (born 1946) is Professor of Semiotics and Linguistic Anthropology at the University of Toronto. He is known for his work in language, communications and semiotics and is Director of the program in semiotics and communication theory. He has also held positions at Rutgers University (1972), University of Rome "La Sapienza" (1988), the Catholic University of Milan (1990) and the University of Lugano. 

He is the editor-in-chief of Semiotica, the official journal of the International Association for Semiotic Studies, and is a past-president of the Semiotic Society of America. Danesi regularly contributes to global discussions on semiotics and human behaviors with appearances including a discussion on kissing on The Deep Cover Show with Damien Dynan and the origins of puzzles in Best Health magazine.

Publications
Danesi is the author of several books. His published work considers the semiotic and anthropological aspects of emoji, popular culture, puzzles, crime, youth and a range of other topics.

His 2016 book, The Semiotics of Emoji, traces the use of emoji back to its anthropological and sociological roots. Reviewing the book in the journal Semiotica (of which Danesi himself has been editor-in-chief since 2004), Omonpee W. Petcoff wrote, "The author purposefully and masterfully presents semiotics principles and pedagogy in non-technical terms. The outcome is a text that, while rich in semiotics fundamentals and terminology, is also inviting, engaging, and, accordingly, accessible to diverse readers." The Internet linguist Gretchen McCulloch's analysis of the book in her review in the Canadian Journal of Linguistics, however, found it was "riddled with elementary errors" and "shoddy citation practices". The details of her analysis are publicly available in the Twitter thread review she posted on her account in August 2018, on which the journal review was based. In 2017, The Semiotics of Emoji was one of four books shortlisted for the annual British Association for Applied Linguistics Book Prize.

Danesi's work has been featured in a range of mainstream publications such as The New York Times, The Guardian and The Globe and Mail.

Bibliography
Selected publications:
 1993  Vico, Metaphor, and the Origin of Language, Indiana University Press
 2004  Messages, Signs, and Meanings: A Basic Textbook in Semiotics and Communication, 3rd ed. Toronto: Canadian Scholars Press
 2007  The Quest for Meaning: A Guide to Semiotic Theory and Practice, Toronto: University of Toronto Press
 2008  Why It Sells: Decoding the Meanings of Brand Names, Logos, Ads, and Other Marketing and Advertising Ploys, Lanham: Rowman & Littlefield
 2013   Signs of Crime: Introduction to Forensic Semiotics, Berlin: Mouton de Gruyter
 2013   The History of the Kiss: The Birth of Popular Culture, New York: Palgrave-Macmillan
 2013   Discovery in Mathematics: An Interdisciplinary Approach, Munich: Lincom Europa
 2013  (with Antonio Nicaso) Made Men: Mafia Culture and the Power of Symbols and Ritual, Rowman & Littlefield
 2013   Encyclopedia of Media and Communication, University of Toronto Press
 2015   Popular Culture: Introductory Perspectives, 3rd ed. Lanham: Rowman & Littlefield. Pp. xi, 330
 2016   The Semiotics of Emoji: The Rise of Visual Language in the Age of the Internet, Bloomsbury Academic
 2020   "Pi (π)" in Nature, Art, and Culture, Brill

References

Italian semioticians
Academic staff of the Sapienza University of Rome
Academic staff of the University of Toronto
Academic staff of the Università Cattolica del Sacro Cuore
Academic staff of the University of Lugano
1946 births
Living people
Communication theorists
Place of birth missing (living people)
Presidents of the Semiotic Society of America